Avocado toast is a type of open sandwich consisting of toast with mashed avocado, and any of a variety of spices and flavorful ingredients. The most popular are usually salt and black pepper, sometimes lemon juice or other citrus, while others include olive oil, hummus, vinegar, red pepper flakes, feta, duqqa and tomato.

Avocado toast became a food trend of the 2010s.  It has appeared on café menus since at least the 1990s. Following avocado toast's elevation to trend status, the act of ordering avocado toast at a café was criticized as a symbol of frivolous spending.

Origins 

Avocados are a native fruit of the Americas with their likely origin being Central Mexico. The trees and fruit have been cultivated by pre-Columbian civilizations from South Central Mexico for nearly 9,000 years. 

Sliced or mashed avocado has been eaten on some sort of bread, flatbread, or tortilla (often heated or toasted) since humans first started consuming bread and avocados, and before any documented or written history. In Chile avocado on marraqueta or "pan con palta" or "tostadas con palta" is a common traditional breakfast. and has been eaten since at least 1926, as the recipe is written in the book "Manual de Cocina" by Lucia Larrain Bulnes.

In some countries in the Americas, avocado toast for breakfast has been such a staple in the diet, that there is no documentation, nor was there a reason to document (such as in a recipe) such a basic, simple spread on toast.

The consumption of avocados on bread or toast has been reported in various sources from the late 19th century onward. In the San Francisco Bay Area, people have been eating avocado toast since at least 1885. In 1915, the California Avocado Association described serving small squares of avocado toast as an appetizer. In an article published in The New Yorker on 1 May 1937, titled "Avocado, or the Future of Eating", the writer eats "avocado sandwich on whole wheat and a lime rickey." In 1962, an article in The New York Times showcased a "special" way to serve avocado as the filling of a toasted sandwich. According to The Washington Post, it was believed that chef Bill Granger may have been the first person to put avocado toast on a modern café menu in 1993, although the dish is documented in Brisbane, Australia, as early as 1929.  In 1999, food writer Nigel Slater published a recipe for an avocado "bruschetta" in The Guardian. The journalist and editor Lauren Oyler credited Cafe Gitane with bringing the dish to the United States in its "Instagrammable" form, as it grew as a food trend. Chloe Osborne, the consulting chef at Cafe Gitane in Manhattan, who first put avocado toast on its menu, tried it herself for the first time in Queensland, Australia, in the mid-1970s.

Modern day 

Jayne Orenstein of The Washington Post reports, "avocado toast has come to define what makes food trends this decade: It's healthy and yet ever-so-slightly indulgent. It can be made vegan and gluten-free." Gwyneth Paltrow has been credited with the popularization of avocado toast through her recipe book, It's All Good. The dish was popularized on social media, with many food bloggers recreating the dish. Bon Appétit magazine published a recipe for "Your New Avocado Toast" in its January 2015, and by 2016, the dish was being depicted on T-shirts, with the Washington Post calling it "more than just a meal – it's a meme".

Some writers argue that its popularity overlaps with the clean living movement.  The fad has reportedly increased the price of avocados.

The popularity and demand for avocados has placed unprecedented pressure on the environment, leading to a reaction by some environmentally-aware cafés, which have now removed avocado toast from their menus.

Variations

Variations include avocado on sweet potato toast, avocado and Vegemite toast, French toast with avocado and Parmesan, avocado toast fingers with soft-boiled eggs, avocado and baked beans on toast, and avocado and feta smash on toasted rye. Another common variation is toast with smashed avocados, soft-boiled egg, and other toppings, often including hot sauce.

Economy 

In Australia in late 2016, consumption of avocado smashed on toast became a target of criticism, after columnist Bernard Salt in The Australian wrote an article that he had seen "young people order smashed avocado with crumbled feta on five-grain toasted bread at $22 a pop and more", arguing that they should be saving to buy a house instead.  Millennials countered that they felt "a sense of futility" in saving for a house with the high cost of housing in Australia, and that figures showed that even if they gave up avocado toast, it would still take about a decade to save for a home deposit.  Furthermore, cafes were said to have become the primary space for millennials to catch up with their friends.  In the wake of the controversy, several cafés offered 'discount' versions of smashed avocado on toast.  Home lender ME bank started a home loan campaign with the slogan "Have your smashed avo and eat it too".

Tim Gurner, a 35-year-old Australian property developer, stated in May 2017 that millennials should not be buying smashed avocado on toast and $4 lattes in their pursuit of home ownership.  In response to this, it was estimated that the savings of forgoing avocado on toast would be an estimated €500 annually, and that at this rate it would take over 500 years to save for a house in the Republic of Ireland, at current market prices.  This use of avocado toast has been likened to David Bach's "Latte Factor".

See also

 Avocado cake
 Cuisine of California
 List of avocado dishes
 List of toast dishes

References

Toast dishes
Avocado dishes
2010s in food
Australian cuisine
Cuisine of Brisbane
Food and drink in California
Cuisine of the Western United States
Open-faced sandwiches